Allodus is a genus of fungi in the family Pucciniastraceae.

Species 
The following species are accepted in the genus Allodus:

 Allodus acnisti
 Allodus ancizari
 Allodus arabidicola
 Allodus asperior
 Allodus bouvardiae
 Allodus carnegiana
 Allodus complicata
 Allodus consimilis
 Allodus cornuta
 Allodus crassipes
 Allodus dichelostemmae
 Allodus douglasii
 Allodus erigeniae
 Allodus giliae
 Allodus imperspicua
 Allodus insignis
 Allodus interveniens
 Allodus intumescens
 Allodus jussiaeae
 Allodus lacerata
 Allodus lindrothii
 Allodus ludwigiae
 Allodus megalospora
 Allodus microica
 Allodus moreniana
 Allodus musenii
 Allodus nocticolor
 Allodus opposita
 Allodus opulenta
 Allodus pagana
 Allodus palmeri
 Allodus podophylli
 Allodus rubicunda
 Allodus scaberistipes
 Allodus subangulata
 Allodus superflua
 Allodus swertiae
 Allodus yosemitana

References 

 
Basidiomycota genera